Emerson Heights Historic District, also known as Emerson Heights Addition and Chas. M. Cross Trust Clifford Avenue Addition,  is a national historic district located at Indianapolis, Indiana.  The district encompasses 1,000 contributing buildings and 9 contributing structures in a predominantly residential section of Indianapolis. They include 659 houses, 334 garages, 7 commercial buildings, and 9 objects. It was developed between about 1910 and 1940, and includes representative examples of Colonial Revival, Tudor Revival, and Bungalow / American Craftsman style architecture. The houses are characteristically of frame construction with brick front porches, with some brick dwellings.

It was listed on the National Register of Historic Places in 2010.

References

Historic districts on the National Register of Historic Places in Indiana
Gothic Revival architecture in Indiana
Colonial Revival architecture in Indiana
Tudor Revival architecture in Indiana
Historic districts in Indianapolis
National Register of Historic Places in Indianapolis